Andy Cowan is an Australian blues soul pianist and singer. He was nominated for the 2001 ARIA Award for Best Blues and Roots Album with 10.30 Thursdays.

Andy Cowan was a member of Madder Lake (1973–75) and Ayers Rock (1978-81) and toured with Renee Geyer, Kevin Borich and Ian Moss. Cowan has done session work for many Australian recordings and film and has released eight solo albums and a live DVD "A Tale Of Two Cities" recorded in Melbourne and Sydney. He currently lives on the Sunshine Coast, Queensland, Australia.

Discography

Albums

Awards

ARIA Music Awards
The ARIA Music Awards is an annual awards ceremony that recognises excellence, innovation, and achievement across all genres of Australian music. 

|-
| ARIA Music Awards of 2001
| 10.30pm Thursdays
| Best Blues & Roots Album
| 
|-

References

External links
The Music of Andy Cowan

Living people
Australian musicians
Year of birth missing (living people)